Senator Dalton may refer to:

Daniel Dalton (American politician) (born 1949), New Jersey State Senate
Edwina P. Dalton (born 1936), Virginia State Senate
John N. Dalton (1931–1986), Virginia State Senate
Theodore Roosevelt Dalton (1901–1989), Virginia State Senate
Tristram Dalton (1738–1817), U.S. Senator from Massachusetts from 1789 to 1791
Walter H. Dalton (born 1949), North Carolina State Senate